Royal Air Force Ludham or more simply RAF Ludham is a former Royal Air Force station located near the village of Ludham, Norfolk.

History

The airfield at Ludham was built by Richard Costain Ltd and became operational in November 1941 as a second satellite for the main fighter station at RAF Coltishall sited north of Norwich, three tarmac-covered concrete runways and ancillary buildings being built on the land which had belonged to Fritton Farm. A total of ten RAF fighter squadrons (eight flying various marks of Supermarine Spitfire, and two flying the Hawker Typhoon 1B were based here between December 1941 and July 1945.

Fighter duties from Ludham were fairly regular and generally coastal and convoy patrols of little note, but the results of one sortie on 28 January 1943 by No. 167 Squadron RAF, whose Spitfires were scrambled to intercept and shoot down a German Ju 88 that was harassing shipping off the East coast, was witnessed by HM The King and Queen, who happened to be visiting the station that same afternoon.

Although allocated to the United States Army Air Forces (USAAF) as Station 177 in August 1943 no American units were based there and, after an uneventful period of little or no activity, on 24 August 1944 it was transferred from No. 12 Group RAF to the Admiralty and occupied by the Mobile Naval Airfields Organisation.

Ludham was then commissioned as HMS Flycatcher, RNAS Ludham on 4 September 1944 under the command of the Senior Officer Mobile Naval Airfields Organisation. At Ludham the MNAO assembled and despatched the first five Mobile Naval Air Bases (MONAB) and one "Transportable Aircraft Maintenance Yard" (TAMY). In February 1945 HMS Flycatcher moved from Ludham to RAF Middle Wallop in Hampshire as this location was more advantageous to shipping the assembled units to the Far East.

The RAF then took back control of Ludham, when some limited detachments by fighter squadrons took place, but the site was eventually closed down in 1946. By 1961 the land had been re-acquired by local farmers with various buildings still remaining around the perimeter and, although most of the airfield site has returned to agriculture, a small portion of the east–west runway is still used for private flying.

Based units
The following units were here at some point:
 No. 1 Squadron RAF
 No. 19 Squadron RAF
 No. 91 Squadron RAF
 No. 167 Squadron RAF
 No. 195 Squadron RAF
 No. 602 Squadron RAF
 No. 603 Squadron RAF
 No. 610 Squadron RAF
 No. 611 Squadron RAF
 No. 1489 (Fighter) Gunnery Flight RAF
 No. 2819 Squadron RAF Regiment
 No. 2893 Squadron RAF Regiment

References

Citations

Bibliography

Ludham
Ludham
Ludham